Lučko Airfield is an airfield for general aviation and unscheduled air transport, located in Ježdovec near Lučko, Croatia,  southwest of Zagreb. Due to the lack of surfacing on the runways, it is only used from spring to autumn in dry periods. Aside from traffic, the airport is today a venue for air shows, such as Zagreb Air Show and Adria Air Race and an operation base for civilian pilot training.

Lučko was formerly Zagreb's main international airport, and later supported military aviation. It was constructed in 1943 and saw commercial operations from 1947 to 1959, after which commercial traffic was moved to the new Zagreb Airport with paved runways in Pleso. Lučko thereafter remained an airport for military and general aviation. Today it is also used by Croatian special police's Lučko Anti-Terrorist Unit.

The airport is equipped to serve light aircraft, helicopters, gliders, ultralight aviation, UAVs and parachuting. It is connected to Zagreb and Lučko by a regular bus line.

History 
The area was first used for air traffic in World War II by Luftwaffe in 1943. The next year the airfield was upgraded with a roughly  grass runway, a small hangar, twelve mid-sized sheds for airplanes as well as workshops, and towards the end of the war saw use by the Independent State of Croatia Air Force. After the end of World War II, the airport began serving domestic commercial flights on 1 April 1947, soon adding international flights to the roster and taking the place of Borongaj Airport, which was heavily bombed during the war, as Zagreb's international airport. Its first year of commercial operation saw 1,430 flights, 11,000 passengers and thirty tonnes of cargo. After the opening of the new Zagreb Airport in Pleso in 1962, Lučko Airport's importance waned, as its grass runways were never paved to accommodate newer, heavier Convair jets, which were displacing Douglas DC-3 airliners' market share by the late 1950s. The commercial traffic was moved to Pleso and Lučko was allocated completely to the Yugoslav National Army and Aeroklub Zagreb, the latter of which was the first to open a civilian pilot school at Lučko. In 1978, the 14th World Parachuting Championships was held at Lučko.

In the 1990s, during the Croatian War of Independence, the airport was bombed by the Yugoslav National Army, but the raid had been expected and all the airplanes and equipment had been evacuated beforehand. Two of the civilian airplanes were donated by their owners to the nascent Croatian air forces. After its formation, the Croatian Air Force began to use Lučko as an Air Base. The 94th Air Force Base was stationed there until it was disbanded in 2000, though the airport continues to be used by the Air Force. As of 2007, an Air Force helicopter squadron was stationed at Lučko. The Lučko Anti-Terrorist Unit of Croatian special police is also based at Lučko Airport and stations its helicopters there.

One notable accident happened during the era of the airport's commercial operation, on 21 September 1950, when a Douglas DC-3 on a domestic Jugoslavenski Aerotransport (JAT) flight crashed, killing 10 of the 11 people on board.

Facilities 
The aerodrome is located on Ježdovečka Road 17 on the outskirts of the village of Ježdovec. The field is only used during dry periods from spring to autumn as the runways are not paved. Shuttle bus service is not provided  but Ježdovec is served by the ZET bus line 168.

There are two parallel runways in west-southwest and east-southeast orientation. The southern runway (10R/28L) is used mainly for powered aircraft, while the northern (10L/28R) is exclusively for unpowered aircraft. The airport also has two anemometres, three aprons, and a control tower responsible for monitoring air traffic over the surrounding area and most of Zagreb west of Dubrava.

Air shows and competitions 
Lučko has been a venue for a number of air shows and competitions, such as the yearly Zagreb Air Show, and Zagreb Cup (a parachuting precision landing competition), as well as the 2nd Adria Air Race in 2012. Aeroklub Zagreb has also several times held Meetings for Rudi, an air show in remembrance of Croatian Air Force pilot Rudolf Perešin. Fédération Aéronautique Internationale's 14th World Precision Flying Championship took place at Lučko on 7–14 July 2002, attracting 54 participants from seventeen countries.

The 2nd Military World Games took place in Zagreb in 1999, and the parachuting competition was held at the Lučko Airport.

References

Sources

External links 
 
 

Airports in Croatia
Buildings and structures in Zagreb
Transport in Zagreb
Civil aviation in Croatia
Economy of Zagreb